Kenon may refer to:

Kenon, a lake in Transbaikalia, Russian Far East
Larry Kenon (b, 1952), an American basketball player
Kenon Holdings, a public corporation